The four corners offense, technically four corner stall, is an offensive strategy for stalling in basketball. Four players stand in the corners of the offensive half-court while the fifth dribbles the ball in the middle. Most of the time the point guard stays in the middle, but the middle player would periodically switch, temporarily, with one of the corner players. It was a strategy that was used in college basketball before the shot clock was instituted.

The team running the offense typically would seek to score, but only on extremely safe shots. The players in the corners might try to make backdoor cuts, or the point guard could drive the lane.

Even if the team wanted to hold the ball until the end of the game, some such strategy was necessary since the rules did not (and still do not) let a player hold the ball for more than five seconds while closely guarded. So some mechanism to facilitate safe passes would be needed, which the four corners provided. There were other slowdown strategies, but the four corners was the most well known.

It was most frequently used to retain a lead by holding on to the ball until the clock ran out. The trailing team would be forced to spread their defense in hopes of getting a steal, which often allowed easy drives to the basket. Sometimes it was used throughout the game to reduce the number of possessions in hopes of getting an upset against a stronger team.

The "5 seconds closely guarded" rule was originally introduced partly to prevent stalling, and other rule changes were made to the college rules through the 1970s in hopes of eliminating stalling without using a shot clock as the National Basketball Association had since the 1954–55 season. (Thus, the four corners has always been a strategy of high school and college basketball.) There was a perception that the NBA shot clock did not allow time to work the ball to get a good shot, and that it would reduce the opportunity for varied styles of play.

The offense was created by head coach (Neal Baisi of WV Tech fame in the mid-1950s) John McClendon, and popularized (at the Div.1 level) by longtime University of North Carolina at Chapel Hill head coach Dean Smith in the early 1960s. He used it to great effect under point guard Phil Ford; it was during his career that some writers referred to the offense as the "Ford Corners."

However, by the 1980s, fans were fed up. In the nationally televised 1982 ACC championship game between the University of North Carolina Tar Heels and the University of Virginia Cavaliers, UNC held the ball for roughly the last seven minutes of the second half to nurse a small lead, eventually winning 47–45. This style of offense was so distinctive that a local restaurant-bar in Chapel Hill, NC, was called Four Corners in homage to Smith, a local hero.

The next year, the ACC and other conferences introduced a shot clock experimentally, along with a three-point line to force the defense to spread out. In 1985, the National Collegiate Athletic Association adopted a shot clock nationally and added the 3-pointer a year later.

On February 21, 2015 the Tar Heels, coached by Smith protege Roy Williams, successfully ran the offense on the opening possession against the Georgia Tech Yellow Jackets as a tribute to the recently deceased Smith.

References

Basketball terminology
North Carolina Tar Heels men's basketball
Basketball strategy